Hubert Standard Upjohn (January 4, 1881 – March 19, 1965) was an American football coach. He served as the head football coach at the Academy of Idaho—now known as Idaho State University–from 1905 to 1906, compiling a record of 3–2–3. Upjohn was a 1903 graduate of Kalamazoo College and a 1904 graduate of the University of Chicago.

Head coaching record

References

External links
 

1881 births
1965 deaths
Idaho State Bengals football coaches
Kalamazoo College alumni
University of Chicago alumni
People from Kalamazoo, Michigan